Notentulus is a genus of proturans in the family Acerentomidae.

Species
 Notentulus tropicus Bonet, 1942
 Notentulus zunynicus Yin, 1989

References

Protura